Nemcovce is a village and municipality in Bardejov District in the Prešov Region of north-east Slovakia.

History
In historical records the village was first mentioned in 1427

Geography
The municipality lies at an altitude of 210 metres and covers an area of 5.459 km2.
It has a population of about 260 people.

External links
 
http://www.statistics.sk/mosmis/eng/run.html

Villages and municipalities in Bardejov District
Šariš